A Woman Misunderstood is a 1921 British silent short drama film directed by Jack Raymond and Fred Paul. It marked Raymond's directorial debut.

References

Bibliography
 Gifford, Denis. The Illustrated Who's Who in British Films. B.T. Batsford, 1978.

External links

1921 films
British drama films
British silent short films
1921 drama films
Films directed by Jack Raymond
Films directed by Fred Paul
British black-and-white films
1920s English-language films
1920s British films
Silent drama films